Yemeni cuisine is distinct from the wider Middle Eastern cuisines, but with a degree of regional variation. Although some foreign influences are evident in some regions of the country (with Ottoman influences showing in Sanaa, while Indian influence is evident in the southern areas around Aden and Mukalla), the Yemeni kitchen is based on similar foundations across the country.

Customs
The generous offering of food to guests is one of the customs in Yemeni culture, and a guest not accepting the offering is considered an insult. Meals are typically consumed while sitting on the floor or ground. Unlike the tradition in most Arab countries, lunch is the main meal of the day in Yemen, not dinner.

Food preparation
In Yemen, many kitchens have a tandoor (also called tannur), which is a round clay oven.

Fruits and vegetables
Tomatoes, onions, and potatoes are some of the staple fruits and vegetables in Yemen.

Meat and dairy

Chicken, goat, and lamb are the staple meats in Yemen. They are eaten more often than beef. Fish is also eaten, especially in the coastal areas.

Cheese, butter, and other dairy products are less common in the Yemeni diet. Buttermilk, however, is enjoyed almost daily in some villages where it is most available. The most commonly used fats are vegetable oil and ghee used in savory dishes, while clarified butter, known as semn (سمن), is the choice of fat used in pastries.

Pork consumption is forbidden to Muslims in Yemen, in accordance with Islamic dietary laws.

Legumes
Broad beans are used in Yemeni dishes, such as bean salad. Lentils are also used in dishes such as stews.

Yemeni dishes

Breakfast dishes
Yemeni people prefer to have warm dishes in the morning. Typically, the meal consists of different types of pastries with a cup of Yemeni coffee or tea.

A more hearty meal often includes legumes, eggs, or even roasted meat or kebab, which is usually served with a type of bread either aside or as a sandwich. People in Yemen also make a breakfast dish that is made from lamb or beef liver, which is considered a bizarre delicacy to non-Yemenis.

Dishes common at breakfast include fattah, fatoot, ful medames, mutabbaq, and shakshouka.

Lunch dishes
Unlike most countries, lunch is the main meal of the day in Yemen, not dinner. The largest amount of meat, poultry, and grains are consumed at lunch.

Dishes common at lunch include:
 Aseed—a dish made from a cooked wheat-flour lump of dough, sometimes with added butter or honey
 Fahsa—a Yemeni stew made from lamb cutlets with lamb broth

 Fattah—a dish made with pieces of fresh, toasted, grilled, or stale flatbread covered with other ingredients
 Haneeth—a slow-roasted lamb dish cooked in a tannour with a spice rub, usually served on a plate of rice
 Harees—boiled, cracked, or coarsely ground wheat, mixed with meat and seasoned

 Jachnun—a Yemenite Jewish pastry, traditionally served on Shabbat morning
 Kabsa—a mixed rice dish, served on a communal platter
 Komroh—made with fava beans, garlic, ghee, black pepper, and salt
 Mandi—meat and rice with a special blend of spices, cooked in a pit underground
 Samak mofa
 Shafut— typically made with lahoh (a sourdough flatbread) or shredded bread, hakeen (traditional buttermilk) or yogurt, zhug, and leek
Shawiyah
 Thareed—pieces of bread in a vegetable or meat broth
 Zhug/skhug — a spicy green sauce made of fresh herbs, garlic, chilies, olive oil, lemon, and freshly ground spices.
 Zurbiyan—a dish made with lamb, rice, and saffron

National dish

After Yemen united in 1990, both North and South Yemen had similar cuisines. Despite its regional variations, saltah is considered to be the national dish of Yemen. The most common dishes consumed all over Yemen are made with rice and lamb.

There are many ways of preparing lamb in Yemen. In general though, the lamb is usually bone-in large chunks. It can be boiled in its broth and called maraq, it can be roasted in an oven like haneeth, or underground like mandi.

Yemeni bread varieties

Breads are an integral part of Yemeni cuisine, most of which are prepared from local grains. Unleavened flatbreads are common. Ṣalūf, a flatbread made from wheat flour, is the most common of all breadstuffs. The dough is allowed to ferment with ḫamīrah, while some would baste the surface of the dough with a prepared batch of unseasoned fenugreek (ḥilba) prior to baking.

Khobz al tawa, malooga, kader, kubane, fateer, kudam, oshar, khameer, and mulawah are also popular breads eaten in Yemen. Malooj, khubz, and khamir are popular homemade breads. Store-bought pita bread and roti (bread rolls like French bread) are also common.

Other Yemeni grain dishes
 ʻAṣīṭ—sorghum meal, cornmeal, or green barley meal made into a thick paste after being boiled in water. Before eating, samneh or oil is added. Some eat ʻaṣīṭ during the afternoon meal (usually scooped up with one's fingers), where soup and meat are served, while others place it in the soup, along with ḥilba ("fenugreek dollop").
 Harīš—a thick dish (groats), made with cracked wheat, – of the kernel's full size, known collectively as ğašūš. There are some who add samneh (clarified butter), honey or sugar to harīš.
In Yemen, harīš is usually eaten on cold winter mornings, and, because of perceived health benefits, is given to women during the first weeks after childbirth, also to the infirm, the weak, and the frail.
Similarly, harīs is a thick grain dish (groats), made with broken wheat, rice, lentils or beans, pre-cooked in water with an added fatty portion of meat or bone marrow, along with vegetables—spring onions (scallions), garlic, tomatoes, and more. 
 Maṭīṭ—a thin, farinaceous dish (porridge), made with ground wheat or barley (maṭīṭ šiʻīr), drunk with samneh, and occasionally with grated onions or sweet marjoram, which gives it a bitter taste.
 Našūf—a thin, grain-based dish (porridge), made with broken wheat, cooked with either samneh, sugar or honey, and sipped from a bowl, usually for breakfast. Villagers cook našūf with sour milk, adding zḥug (a hot cayenne-pepper sauce) for added flavoring, a dish known locally as našūf ʻalā zūm.

Spices
A spice mixture known as hawaij is employed in many Yemeni dishes. Hawaij includes aniseed, fennel seeds, ginger, and cardamom.

Yemeni cuisine is often prepared hot and spicy with the use of chili peppers, cumin, coriander seeds, turmeric, and other spices. Herbs such as fenugreek, mint, and cilantro are also used. Fenugreek is used as one of the main ingredients in the preparation of a paste or sauce called holba (also spelled hulba). A popular spice used in breads (including kubane and sabayah) is black cumin, which is also known by its Arabic name habasoda (habbat as sowda).

Desserts and sweets
Bint al-sahn (sabayah) is a sweet honey cake or bread from Yemeni cuisine. It is prepared from a dough with white flour, eggs, and yeast, which is then served dipped in a honey and butter mixture.

Other common desserts include fresh fruit (mangoes, bananas, grapes, etc.), baklawa, basbousa, kunafah, zalābiya, halwa, rawani, and masoob. Masoob is a banana-based dessert made from over-ripe bananas, ground flatbread, cream, cheese, dates, and honey.

Honey
In Yemen, honey is produced within the country, and is considered a delicacy. Locally produced honey is in high demand, and it is also considered as a status symbol in the country.

Beverages

Shahi haleeb (milk tea, served after qat), black tea (with cardamom, clove, or mint), qishr (coffee husks), qahwa (Arabic coffee), karkade (an infusion of dried hibiscus flowers), naqe'e al zabib (cold raisin drink), and diba'a (squash nectar) are examples of popular Yemeni drinks. Mango and guava juices are also popular.

Although coffee and tea are consumed throughout Yemen, coffee is the preferred drink in Sana'a, whereas black tea is the beverage of choice in Aden and Hadhramaut. Tea is consumed along with breakfast, after lunch (occasionally with sweets and pastries), and along with dinner. Popular flavorings include cloves with cardamom and mint. A drink made from coffee husks, called qishr, is also enjoyed.

Alcoholic beverages are considered improper due to cultural and religious reasons.

See also

 Arab cuisine
 Halas (food)

References

 
Arab cuisine
Middle Eastern cuisine